Stygicola dentata is a species of fish in the family Bythitidae. It is endemic to Cuba.

Sources
 

Stygicola
Endemic fauna of Cuba
Freshwater fish of Cuba
Taxonomy articles created by Polbot
Taxobox binomials not recognized by IUCN